The Joy Cup was an annual men's professional team golf competition between teams representing the British Isles and the Rest of Europe. It was played from 1954 to 1958. The British Isles won all four contests that were played. The trophy was provided by the Jean Patou company and named after Joy perfume that they produced. The concept of a match between Great Britain/Ireland and Continental Europe was revived with the Hennessy Cognac Cup in 1974.

Format
The cup was contested over two days with 36-hole foursomes on the first day and 36-hole singles matches on the second day. Generally there were 5 foursomes and 10 singles except that in 1956 there were only 4 foursomes and 8 singles.

History
Originally the Rest of Europe team was selected by the European Golf Association while the British team was selected and captain by Henry Cotton. In early 1957, the EGA agreed with the PGA that the PGA would take over from Cotton. A match was planned for 19 and 20 October 1957 in Barcelona but was not held, the 1957 Ryder Cup and the Canada Cup being held in the same month.

In January 1960 it was announced that the Joy Cup had been discontinued. The Jean Patou company withdrew the gold cup that the winners had received.

Results

Appearances
The following are those who played in at least one of the four matches.

British Isles
  Peter Alliss 1954, 1955, 1956, 1958
  Ken Bousfield 1955, 1958
  Harry Bradshaw 1954, 1955, 1956, 1958
  Eric Brown 1954, 1955, 1956, 1958
  Henry Cotton 1954, 1956
  Fred Daly 1954, 1955
  Bernard Hunt 1958
  John Jacobs 1954, 1955, 1958
  Eric Lester 1956
  Peter Mills 1956, 1958
  Christy O'Connor Snr 1955, 1956, 1958
  John Panton 1954, 1956
  Dai Rees 1954, 1955, 1958
  Syd Scott 1954, 1955, 1956
  Harry Weetman 1954, 1955, 1956, 1958

Rest of Europe
  Jean Baptiste Ado 1954, 1958
  Michel Alsuguren 1954
  Alfonso Angelini 1954, 1955, 1958
  Georg Bessner 1954, 1955
  Ovidio Bolognesi 1956
  Aldo Casera 1954, 1955, 1956, 1958
  Carlos Celles 1955, 1956, 1958
  Roger Cotton 1958
  Gerard de Wit 1955, 1956
  Jean Garaïalde 1954, 1955, 1958
  Ugo Grappasonni 1954, 1955, 1956
  Ángel Miguel 1954, 1955, 1956, 1958
  Sebastián Miguel 1954, 1956, 1958
  François Saubaber 1954, 1955
  Ramón Sota 1958
  Donald Swaelens 1958
  Flory Van Donck 1954, 1955, 1956, 1958

References

Team golf tournaments
Recurring sporting events established in 1954
Recurring sporting events disestablished in 1958
1954 establishments in Europe
1958 disestablishments in Europe